The men's shot put event at the 2005 European Athletics U23 Championships was held in Erfurt, Germany, at Steigerwaldstadion on 15 and 17 July.

Medalists

Results

Final
17 July

Qualifications
15 July
Qualifying 18.40 or 12 best to the Final

Group A

Group B

Participation
According to an unofficial count, 17 athletes from 13 countries participated in the event.

 (1)
 (1)
 (1)
 (2)
 (2)
 (1)
 (1)
 (2)
 (1)
 (2)
 (1)
 (1)
 (1)

References

Shot put
Shot put at the European Athletics U23 Championships